Hum Kisise Kum Nahin is a 2002 Indian Hindi action comedy film directed by David Dhawan and produced by Afzal Khan. The film stars Amitabh Bachchan, Sanjay Dutt, Ajay Devgn and Aishwarya Rai.

The movie is heavily inspired from the Harold Ramis directed gangster comedy, Analyze This.

Despite the star cast the film had an average faring at the box office. The film was remade in Kannada as Dhan Dhana Dhan (2011).

Plot 
The film opens with Munna Bhai (Sanjay Dutt), a dreaded Mumbai-streeted goon, on the chase to Pillai (Ashish Vidyarthi). Munna Bhai catches him, and Pillai tries to escape into Komal's (Aishwarya Rai) dancing class. Komal stops Munna from beating him up and makes him say sorry to Pillai. Munna straight-away falls in love with her without realizing that he is in love. Noticing that Munna Bhai seems to be ill, his sidekick takes him to Dr. Rastogi (Amitabh Bachchan), whose diagnosis is that Munna Bhai is suffering from the "love virus" which can only be cured with love. He advises Munna Bhai to try to woo the girl with whom he is smitten. What Dr. Rastogi and Munna Bhai do not realize is that this girl is none other than the doctor's younger sister. Rastogi takes Komal abroad to get her married, unaware she is in love with Raja (Ajay Devgn), the bowling instructor. Raja, in disguise, fools Rastogi and follows them abroad. Munna Bhai is then on gun-point by Pillai, and Raja saves him. Unaware of knowing they both love the same girl, Rastogi makes a torn between them, which ends up getting Raja beat up. Munna Bhai gets his gun out, but before Rastogi realizes what he has done, Komal jumps in to save Raja and is shot. Munna Bhai realizing his mistake, surrenders, and gives up the crime world, while Dr. Rastogi also realizes his mistake and lets Komal marry Raja.

Cast 
 Amitabh Bachchan as Dr. Avinash Rastogi
 Sanjay Dutt as Munna Bhai
 Ajay Devgan as Raja Sharma
 Aishwarya Rai as Komal Rastogi, Dr. Rastogi’s younger sister
 Satish Kaushik as Pappu Pager
 Anu Kapoor as Munnu Mobile
 Paresh Rawal as Commissioner
 Mukesh Rishi as Pillai's Brother
 Ashish Vidyarthi as Pillai Kapoor
 Avtar Gill as Inspector Sayaji Shinde
 Ram Mohan as Jhammu
 Navin Nischol as Dr. DD
 Supriya Karnik as Dr. DD's Wife
 Ali Asgar as Bablu
 Himani Shivpuri as Patient Ramgopal's Wife
 Shashi Kiran
 Rajpal Yadav as Thief
 Vivek Vaswani as Doctor
 Viju Khote as Pandit
 Razzak Khan as Munna Bhai's Man
 Javed Khan
 Shahbaz Khan (actor) as Killer

Critical reception 
The film opened to mixed reviews. Bollywood Hungama gave a three out of five stars cited "The result: Laughter. Fun. Paisa-vasool entertainment. The drama gets a little more amusing thanks to the great chemistry between Amitabh Bachchan and Sanjay Dutt. Dutt is superb as the don. This is amongst his finest performances. Ajay Devgan looks ill at ease in light scenes. Also, he looks pale at places. Aishwarya Rai looks gorgeous and delivers a freewheeling performance".

Rediff gave a negative review said "The film fails to hold the attention, thanks mainly due to the implausible plot. The digs at the Mumbai police force, however, are entertaining. Among the performances, Amitabh Bachchan and Sanjay Dutt keep the viewers engaged in the beginning but they irritate post-intermission. Aishwarya Rai does not have too meaty a part. All she does is attend dance class and fret at the thought of Munnabhai wanting to marry her. Ajay Devgan is a disaster. His underwritten character fails to do him justice. Paresh Rawal in the role of a Police Commissioner is wasted too".

Rakesh Budhu from "Planet-Bollywood" noted "the film is enjoyable for its variety and for the fact that the soundtrack should fit the film well. What’s more is that while the songs are humorous and pointless in their own little ways, they all seem to help the narrative. That would most likely indicate that Dhawan hasn’t blended a thousand films in one hoping that the audience will lap it up. There may just be a plot ("Analyze This" according to the rumor mill). David Dhawan knows that a soundtrack like Taal is a waste in his comedies and while he’s given us better peppy soundtracks, Hum Kisise Kum Nahin is surely not all that bad".

The Hindu stated "If you can overlook the unreality of mainstream Hindi cinema and its elements (for instance the overly colourful sets and décor) this is a film you might just enjoy. Amitabh again proves that comedy is also his forte. Ajay looks good but is not as effective as Sunjay Dutt who makes a delightful don, clumsy and spirited, a role most well done. As for Aishwarya, she does not have much to do except look gorgeous".

Manish Gajjar from BBC said "Hum Kisise Kum Nahin might just end up to be the best of the lot as far as Bollywood comedies are concerned. In this flick, director David Dhawan gives his best to bring out the laughter as it progresses through the story. Amitabh Bachchan as Dr Rastogi he is once again at his comic best. The same applies to Sanjay Dutt, its very refreshing to see that side of him, compared with the macho image which he always portrays on screen. As for Aishwarya, she looks beautiful as ever and excels in the peppy song sequences. But its Ajay Devgan who surprises us with his versatile comic performance, which he enacts with great ease".

Soundtrack 

The soundtrack features 7 songs composed by Anu Malik, with lyrics by Anand Bakshi. The song "Music Part" was not included in the film, it was a bonus instrumental added to the soundtrack.

Box office 
Hum Kisise Kum Nahi released to an average opening at the box office but it failed to live up to expectations, and grossed 17 Crores.

References

External links 
 

2000s Hindi-language films
2002 comedy films
2002 films
Films directed by David Dhawan
Films scored by Anu Malik
Indian action comedy films
Hindi films remade in other languages
T-Series (company) films